Hamworthy is a village, parish, peninsula and suburb of Poole in Dorset, England. It is sited on a peninsula of approximately  that is bordered by the town of Upton to the north, Poole Harbour to the south, Lytchett Bay to the west and Holes Bay to the east. Poole Bridge, the southern terminus of the A350 road, connects the suburb with the town centre. Hamworthy is the location of the Port of Poole ferry passenger terminal and cargo handling operations.

Hamworthy had two local councillors in Poole Borough Council, one for Hamworthy East, and one for Hamworthy West. In Hamworthy there are six main areas, Rockley Park (where Royal Marines Poole and Holiday Park are), Turlin Moor Estate, Lower Hamworthy (where Poole Docks are), Cobbs Quay/Harbourside (Which looks out over Holes Bay), Lake Side (where the Metalbox Factory is located) and Central Hamworthy (Location of the Main Road, Co-Op and Church area).

Hamworthy has a railway station, with a twice hourly South Western Railway service to London Waterloo on the South West Main Line.

History 
The Roman Emperor, Vespasian, brought the Second Augustan Legion to the harbour in 43 AD and founded Hamworthy. The Romans continued to use the harbour throughout the occupation. Hamworthy was the site of an Iron Age settlement before it was taken over by the Romans in the 1st century and named Moriconium. The Romans made use of Poole Harbour, and built a road from Hamworthy to Badbury Rings.

The closure of Poole Power Station in the early 1990s and of other industrial sites close to the bridge has provided an area for regeneration. This included a second bridge crossing, and major house building. The Twin Sails Bridge, opened in March 2012 runs alongside the old lifting bridge.

Education
Hamworthy has four schools: The Cornerstone Academy (ages 11–16), Twin Sails Infant School and Nursery (ages 3–6), Turlin Moor Community School (ages 4–10) and Hamworthy Park Junior School (ages 7–10).

Hamworthy is home to one of the oldest Scout Association groups in the World. 1st Hamworthy Scout Group which has records dating back to October 1908 and still meets every week with a total membership of nearly 150, Beaver Scouts, Cub Scouts and Scouts, 1st Hamworthy Scout Troop was formed out of the original Boys' Brigade unit that had members take part in the original Scout Camp in 1907. The groups records show a Youth Section meeting in Hamworthy under the name of 1st Hamworthy since the original Boy Brigade unit opened in 1883, this unit then transferred membership to the Scout Association in 1908 to become the current Group that exists today. The group was originally one of many in Hamworthy, but has absorbed over groups over time including 2nd Hamworthy, Turlin Moor, Lytchett Bay and St Michaels Church Scout Groups. Today the Group operates sections under two names: 1st Hamworthy and Turlin Moor.

Hamworthy Churches
Hamworthy parish has a number of churches. St. Michael's parish church based on the main Blandford Road is the Church of England parish church. St. Gabriel's church based on Turlin Moor is a smaller Church of England church based in a modern building. There are also other church denominations based in Hamworthy parish.

Sport
Hamworthy has one non-League football clubs: Hamworthy United F.C., which plays at The County Ground in Lower Hamworthy. Poole Borough F.C. play at Turlin Moor Recreation Ground in Upper Hamworthy. Turlin Moor Recreation Ground is also home to Poole Rugby Football Club.

Leisure 
Rockley Park is a caravan-park in western Hamworthy.

Politics 
Hamworthy is part of the Poole parliamentary constituency. Hamworthy is also part of the Hamworthy ward which elects 3 councillors to Bournemouth, Christchurch and Poole Council.

References

 Cochrane, C, 1970. Poole Bay and Purbeck, 300BC to AD1660. Dorchester, Longmans.

External links 

  Carter Community School
  Hamworthy First School & Nursery
  Hamworthy Neighbourhood Watch
  Hamworthy Scout Group
 St. Michaels and St. Gabriel's Church in Hamworthy

Areas of Poole
Poole Harbour
Peninsulas of England